is a former Japanese football player.

Playing career
Maeda was born in Higashiazai District, Shiga on June 30, 1985. After graduating from high school, he joined J1 League club Shimizu S-Pulse in 2004. In 2006, he moved to S.League club Albirex Niigata Singapore. In 2007, he backed to Japan and joined MIO Biwako Kusatsu.

References

1985 births
Living people
Association football people from Shiga Prefecture
Japanese footballers
J1 League players
Shimizu S-Pulse players
MIO Biwako Shiga players
Association football forwards